Dilloway is a surname. Notable people with the surname include:

 Aaron Dilloway (born 1976), American musician
 Charles Dilloway (born 1781), English cricketer
 John Dilloway (1798–1869), English cricketer
 Margaret Dilloway, American novelist

See also
 Dallaway
 Dillaway